The Al-Istiqamah Mosque is a mosque in Serangoon, Singapore which was completed in 1999. It is the only mosque in Singapore to have land allocated for it before the appointment of its Mosque Building Committee by the Islamic Religious Council of Singapore, MUIS.

Profile

Masjid Al Istiqamah is the second mosque to be built under Phase 3 of the Mosque Building Fund scheme headed by Muis. The building is located at Serangoon North Estate, at the corner of Yio Chu Kang Road and Ang Mo Kio Avenue 3, with the front entrance at Serangoon North Avenue 2, directly facing Blk 139 on the opposite side of the street.

The new mosques built within this phase are named after virtuous qualities as a continuation from the first one – Masjid Al-Khair (The Good). Initially, Muis had suggested the name "As-Sobr" (The Patient) for this mosque but after consultation with a few local Islamic scholars, the name "Al-Istiqamah" (the Constant) was chosen.

The three-storeyed mosque with a combination of designs from the Nusantara, Middle East and Mauritius can cater to a maximum of 3,300 worshippers at any one time. Its convertible concept enables the optimisation of space and multiple functionalities of the rooms.

The building is divided into two general areas, viz. the i'tikaf section occupying the 'front' portion, and the multi-purpose section making up the 'rear'. The i'tikaf area which is roofed by solid timber can accommodate about 480, 330 and 270 worshippers on levels one, two and three respectively.

Founding 
When the plot for the mosque building was purchased on August 12, 1992, the fund raising arm of the JPM (Mosque Building Committee) was not even formed! The estimated amount needed was S$700,000 for the basic requirements in the initial stage of building. So few people came forward to volunteer their services that an advertisement had to be put out in the Berita Harian newspaper.

When the JPM was eventually formed in October 1994 together with JPM Pasir Ris (which went on to build Masjid Al-Istighfar) and JPM Bishan (Masjid An-Nahdhah), a different challenge existed – that of the 'competition' to raise funds against the neighbouring, more established mosques: Masjid Haji Yusoff in Kovan which sought to rebuild, and both Masjid En-Naeem in Hougang and Masjid Al-Muttaqin in Ang Mo Kio which planned to extend their existing structure. This, on top of the almost saturated 'Islamic fund-raising circle' constituting other mosques and madrasahs throughout Singapore.

Through sheer hard work of the volunteers, and contributions from the Muslim community not only within the Hougang/Serangoon/Ang Mo Kio areas but islandwide, the construction was finally initiated in March 1998. On June 11, 1999, Masjid Al-Istiqamah was declared waqf (vested property) and began its operation as a full-fledged mosque.

On June 17, 2000, Masjid Al-Istiqamah was inaugurated by the then Permanent Secretary for Education Mr Mohamed Maidin Packer Mohd.

Operations 
Ever since it began operation, Masjid Al-Istiqamah has never locked its gates. Its open policy allows for 24/7 accessibility for the public to its main prayer hall and amenities, a rarity for the typical new generation mosque with valuable assets to look after.

In September 2000, with the official appointment of its Mosque Manager, it became the first mosque in Singapore to have its office administration 'fully accommodated' for the congregation with its opening hours from 8:30 to 22:30 including Saturdays, Sundays and public holidays. Its office closes only on the first two days of Shawwal, for obvious reasons.

Chairmen of Masjid Al-Istiqamah Management Board 
Hj Hashim Ismail (1999–2003)
Hj Mohammad Suhaimi Mohsen (2003–2007)
Hj Mohamed Sa'at Bin Matari (2007–2018)
Hj Juraiman Bin Rahim (2018–Present), Mosque Executive Chairman

Transportation
The mosque is accessible from Hougang MRT station.

See also
 Islam in Singapore
 List of mosques in Singapore

External links 
Al-Istiqamah Mosque
Majlis Ugama Islam Singapura, MUIS (Islamic Religious Council of Singapore)
List of Mosques in Singapore managed by MUIS : Masjid Al-Istiqamah
GoogleMaps StreetView of Masjid Al-Istiqamah

1999 establishments in Singapore
Buildings and structures in Serangoon
Istiqamah
Mosques completed in 1999
20th-century architecture in Singapore